OPDS may stand for:

Open Publication Distribution System, a syndication format for electronic publications
Offshore Petroleum Discharge System, a U.S. Navy system for use with the Inland Petroleum Distribution System

See also
OPD (disambiguation)